is a waterfall in the Hachimantai district of Kosaka, Akita Prefecture, Japan, on the Kosaka branch of the Yoneshiro River. It is one of "Japan’s Top 100 Waterfalls", in a listing published by the Japanese Ministry of the Environment in 1990.
The falls have a height of 60 meters, broken into a series of seven cascades. The falls are easily accessible by car, and are located 8 kilometers from the Kosaka Interchange on the Tōhoku Expressway.

External links
  Ministry of Environment

Waterfalls of Japan
Landforms of Akita Prefecture
Tourist attractions in Akita Prefecture
Kosaka, Akita